The 2017 Georgetown Hoyas football team represented Georgetown University as a member of the Patriot League during the 2016 NCAA Division I FCS football season the 2017 NCAA Division I FCS football season. They were led by fourth-year head coach Rob Sgarlata and played their home games at Cooper Field. Georgetown finished the season 1–10 overall and 0–6 in Patriot League play to place last out of seven teams.

Schedule
The 2017 schedule consists of five home and six away games. The Hoyas will host Patriot League foes Fordham, Lafayette, and Colgate, and will travel to Lehigh, Holy Cross, and Bucknell.

In 2017, Georgetown's non-conference opponents will be Campbell and Marist of the Pioneer Football League, and Columbia, Harvard, and Princeton of the Ivy League.

Game summaries

at Campbell

Marist

at Columbia

Harvard

at Princeton

at Lehigh

Fordham

at Holy Cross

Lafayette

at Bucknell

Colgate

References

Georgetown
Georgetown Hoyas football seasons
Georgetown Hoyas football